"Big Generator" is a song by Yes that appears on their 1987 album, Big Generator. The song was remixed for a radio promotional single  exclusively in the U.S. It appeared on every show on the Big Generator tour, but has not been performed live since.

Meaning
The song, according to Jon Anderson, is about how we are all a part of the Earth, its eyes, its ears, its voice.

Composition 
Chris Squire used a 5-string bass with an A tuning on the lowest string to achieve a much lower sound on the main opening riff of the track.

Personnel
 Jon Anderson – vocals
 Chris Squire – bass guitar, backing vocals
 Trevor Rabin – guitar, backing vocals, keyboards
 Tony Kaye – keyboards
 Alan White – drums, percussion

Notes and references

Yes (band) songs
1987 singles
Songs written by Jon Anderson
Songs written by Chris Squire
Songs written by Trevor Rabin
Song recordings produced by Trevor Horn
Songs written by Alan White (Yes drummer)